Giuseppe Maria Spina (11 March 1756 – 13 November 1828) was an Italian Roman Catholic cardinal.

He was born in Sarzana to an aristocratic family, and moved to Rome to study jurisprudence and canon law. In 1796 he was ordained a priest and in 1798, was appointed Titular Archbishop of Corinth. He accompanied Pope Pius VI to the Napoleon-induced residence in France, and administered his final rights. Sent to Paris by Pope Pius VII to negotiate concordat with Napoleon, he was one of the Vatican envoys who signed the agreement in July, 1801. For these services, he was made Cardinal in pectore on 23 February 1801, and later publicly ordained on 29 March 1802. He served as a papal legate to Forli and Bologna in the following years, and appointed Archbishop of Genoa (1802-1816) and in 1828, Cardinal-Bishop of Palestrina. In 1825, he was appointed Prefect of the Apostolic Signatura.

References

1756 births
1828 deaths
Cardinals created by Pope Pius VI
18th-century Italian cardinals
19th-century Italian cardinals
Cardinal-bishops of Palestrina
Members of the Apostolic Signatura
Cardinals created by Pope Pius VII